Simone Sterbini (born 11 December 1993) is an Italian former professional racing cyclist, who rode professionally between 2015 and 2019 for the  and  teams.

Major results

2013
 10th Gran Premio Palio del Recioto
2014
 1st  Road race, National Under-23 Road Championships
 10th Gran Premio Palio del Recioto
2016
 1st Stage 5 Tour of Austria

References

External links
 

1993 births
Living people
Italian male cyclists
Place of birth missing (living people)
People from Palestrina
Cyclists from Lazio
Sportspeople from the Metropolitan City of Rome Capital